Boggy Lake  is a lake of Guysborough District, in Nova Scotia, Canada. It also extends into Halifax County.  This natural area is characterized by well-defined drumlins with mature to immature old-growth sugar maple, yellow birch, and beech forests, that sit in a matrix of well-drained coniferous hummocky terrain.

See also
List of lakes in Nova Scotia

References

 National Resources Canada

Lakes of Nova Scotia